Herman Davis State Park is a  state park in Manila, Arkansas, United States. The park includes the grave of and a memorial to Herman Davis (1888-1923), a U.S. sniper during World War I.  The park is located at the junction of Baltimore Avenue and Arkansas Highway 18, south of the city center.  It consists of a grassy area, with a concrete walk leading to the memorial.  The memorial is a granite obelisk,  in height, in front of which stands a full-size granite likeness of Davis in his infantry uniform.  Davis' remains are buried just behind the monument.  The site is the only location in Arkansas associated with Davis, a native of Manila who won distinction in the war for taking out a nest of German machine gunners with his marksmanship.  Davis modestly rarely mentioned the awards he received for this and other actions (including the US Distinguished Service Medal and two French Croix de Guerre), but was called out by General John J. Pershing, who placed him fourth on a list of 100 heroes of the war.

After his death, Arkansans rallied to erect a memorial in his honor, resulting in the establishment of this site as a local memorial in 1925.  The park was formally designated a state park in 1953, and the Arkansas Department of Parks and Tourism is responsible for its maintenance.  The original statue of Davis, executed in marble, was destroyed by vandals in 1967; it was replaced by the present statue.  The park was listed on the National Register of Historic Places in 1995.

See also

National Register of Historic Places listings in Mississippi County, Arkansas

References

State parks of Arkansas
Protected areas of Mississippi County, Arkansas
Parks on the National Register of Historic Places in Arkansas
National Register of Historic Places in Mississippi County, Arkansas
Monuments and memorials on the National Register of Historic Places in Arkansas
Obelisks in the United States
World War I memorials in the United States
1925 establishments in Arkansas
Buildings and structures completed in 1925
Statues in Arkansas